The Horseman on the Roof (orig. French Le Hussard sur le toit) is a 1951 adventure novel written by Jean Giono. It tells the story of Angelo Pardi, a young Italian carbonaro colonel of hussars, caught up in the 1832 cholera epidemic in Provence. 

In 1995, it was made into a film of the same name directed by Jean-Paul Rappeneau.

See also 
Le Monde 100 Books of the Century

1951 French novels
French novels adapted into films
Novels by Jean Giono